Julius Meinl V (born 9 July 1959) is a British businessman, resident in Prague Czech Republic (since end of August 2013). He heads a substantial family business which was originally built upon the production and retailing of food products, and which was founded by his great-great-grandfather, Julius Meinl I, in Vienna in 1862.

Early life
Julius Meinl V was born in Vienna, Austria to a wealthy family. To prepare him to join the family business, he was educated at the Ecole des Hautes Etudes Economiques, Juridiques et Sociales, St Gallen, one of the world's leading business schools.  He then gained experience in London with Swiss Bank Corporation and later in the United States with Brown Brothers Harriman, America's oldest and largest private bank. As a boy, Meinl V went to school in Austria, before finishing a degree in banking in Switzerland at the University of St. Gallen.

Family (and family business) history
The Julius Meinl name is synonymous with the family business, and the brand is one of the most well known and prestigious in Austria. The family fortunes were built initially upon the manufacture and sale of quality ground coffee.  From this beginning the company grew steadily and successfully, retailing an increasingly wide variety of foods.  Over time it become the upmarket grocery multiple, with outlets throughout Austria and in many other Central and Eastern European countries.  It also became one of Austria's largest companies.

In 1938, Meinl V's grandfather Julius Meinl III (1903–1991) was forced to leave Austria along with his Jewish wife and their son Meinl IV, while the rest of the Meinl family remained in Austria. Meinl V's mother's family also fled Austria, just managing to escape in 1940. Meinl III took his family to Britain. For this "act of treachery" the German government revoked the citizenship of the Meinl family, denouncing them as "enemies of the Reich". Meinl family became naturalised British citizens in 1946.

During the course of World War II, Meinl III was in close contact with the authorities in Britain, providing advice and assistance on the manner in which the Nazi Party had extended its influence on Central Europe through the infiltration of the management of large retail organisations. After the war, Julius Meinl III assisted the Central Commission for Germany and Austria in the process of denazification of Austria. Meinl's contribution involved the identification of significant Nazi sympathisers who were occupying positions of authority in Austria and who had remained undetected.  This work merely added to the growing list of those within Austria with a distaste for the name, Meinl.

Nevertheless, the family returned to Austria to begin the task of rebuilding the family business, which they did with considerable success, expanding the range of its retail operations throughout central Europe.  It also ventured into banking, building a simple savings business into a small private bank.

Career
After graduating from university in banking, he spent two years in London with Swiss Bank Corporation and a further two years in New York at Brown Brothers Harriman, New York; America's oldest and largest private bank.

In 1998, a Central European and Eastern European real-estate company was launched.  It was introduced on the Vienna Stock Exchange in 2002 under the name Meinl European Land. In 2007, Meinl Airports International and Meinl International Power, specialised airport and energy investment funds, were additionally listed on the Vienna Stock Exchange.  The Group's main area of activity is Central and Eastern Europe. Meinl V was not a director of any of the three funds. Also in 2007, after a controversial repurchase of certificates by Meinl European Land, the name "Meinl" appeared in the Austrian media on a negative basis.

From 2014-2017 Julius Meinl served as President of the Euro-Asian Jewish Congress, a sub-organization of the World Jewish Congress in Jerusalem. In October 2017 Julius Meinl was appointed World Jewish Congress' Commissioner for Combating Antisemitism.

Meinl Bank
In 1983, at the age of 24, Meinl V assumed the reins of the Meinl Bank. In the early 1990s, Julius Meinl AG reestablished food-retail operations in Hungary, the Czech Republic, and Poland, where it had historically already been present. In 1998/99, the company implemented the divestiture of the food-retailing assets of Julius Meinl AG in Austria and Hungary, following which the group's activities became focused primarily on banking and finance operations. At this time, the activities of Meinl Bank were expanded, covering private and institutional asset management, private banking, and fund management. Meinl Bank became one of the leading Austrian private merchant and investment banks. In 2000, a subsidiary named Meinl Capital Markets was opened in London to provide broking services specialising in hedge funds and exchange traded funds. However, this operation was closed down in 2001. Also in 2001, the subsidiary Meinl Capital Advisors AG was founded to provide corporate finance and investment banking advisory services to governments and private clients.

In June 2019, Julius Meinl V resigned as Chairman of the Supervisory Board and the bank changed its name to Anglo Austrian AAB Bank. 

At the request of the Austrian Financial Market Authority (FMA), the European Central Bank (ECB) withdrew the banking licence of the bank on 15 November 2019. Using this as a pretext, the FMA had liquidators for the bank appointed who on 2 March 2020 filed an application for insolvency which was granted one day later. Appeals against all three decisions in this regard – the withdrawal of the banking licence by the ECB, the appointment of liquidators, and the opening of insolvency proceedings – have been filed in the respective courts. While the appeals with respect to the licence withdrawal and the appointment of the liquidators are still pending, the Austrian Supreme Court (OGH) ruled on 13 July 2020 that the opening of insolvency proceedings against the bank had been unlawful. The FMA immediately filed a new application for insolvency which was again found unlawful by the Vienna Appeals Court in August 2020.

A major argument for the withdrawal of the banking licence was the FMA’s allegation that the bank was involved in money laundering transactions. Prior to and parallel to the licence withdrawal process, the FMA had filed several criminal complaints against the bank and its (former) managers with the Vienna prosecutors. However, the Vienna prosecutors – after years of investigations, involving judicial assistance from around the world and investigators travelling to foreign jurisdictions – dismissed all such allegations on 26 May 2020 and closed the respective proceedings in connection with money laundering against the bank and its (former) managers, as none of the alleged criminal involvement brought forward by the FMA could withstand scrutiny.

Legal matters
In 2008, an investigation was commenced in Austria into the collapse in value of shares in Meinl European Land Limited.  The same year, a parallel investigation was commenced in Jersey, in the Channel Islands, Meinl European Land being a Jersey company.
On 1 April 2009, a judge ordered Meinl V to be arrested following an interrogation by Vienna prosecutors.  Meinl, who was at that time suspected of involvement in yet-to-be defined wrongdoing, was required to post bail of 100 million euros, because the judge considered him a flight risk due to his holding a British passport.  Meinl remains uncharged with any offence.

In February 2012, the Jersey Financial Services Commission announced that it had closed its investigation into the affairs of Meinl European Land, having found no evidence of wrongdoing.,

Following a decision of the Higher Regional Court of Vienna, most of the record deposit – 90 million euros – was refunded in March 2013. From the perspective of Meinl Bank, the only logical conclusion after this step is to close the criminal proceedings against Meinl. . The previous investigations have lasted for more than five years until now (May 2013) and are still without any result. In the course of the proceedings documents were seized by means of police raids, and according to an article in the daily newspaper Die Presse those documents are an absolute mess that was allegedly inflicted by a surveyor.

On December 31, 2014 Meinl and four other elements of Meinl Bank were charged with dishonesty in relation to a 212 million euro dividend paid out by his private bank. All five defendants, including Julius Meinl, have raised objections to the indictment in due time. In these objections the defendants pointed out that they behaved lawfully and strongly criticized the state prosecutor of Vienna as well as the indictment. As announced on April 17, 2015, the Vienna Higher Regional Court (OLG Wien) upheld the oppositions and rejected the charges against Julius Meinl and other defendants.

Personal life 
Julius Meinl V is married to Dr. Ariane Meinl since 2012; Mr. Meinl has a son, Julius VI who's married Norwegian-born Olivia Holten - Stolt Nielsen on 2016, 1 July.

References

External links 
 Meinl European Land
 Photograph of Julius Meinl V at The New York Times website

Austrian businesspeople
British businesspeople
Living people
1959 births
University of St. Gallen alumni